Mangum was an unincorporated town in Eastland County, Texas. It was founded in the late 1890s at the intersection of the Missouri-Kansas-Texas Railway (abandoned in 1967) and the Eastland, Wichita Falls and Gulf Railroad (abandoned in 1944). Mangum was named for the Bob Mangum family. The town's population peaked in 1915 at 125; by 1936, only a handful of residents remained. Some time in the late 1980s' the town was removed from highway maps. In 2000 the population of Mangum was estimated at 15. Today the site is a ghost town.

External links
 
 

Ghost towns in Central Texas
Geography of Eastland County, Texas